Pseudophoridae is an extinct family of tropical warm-water Paleozoic sea snails.
This family is unassigned to superfamily. This family has no subfamilies.

References 

Prehistoric gastropods